The 2014–15 Polska Hokej Liga season was the 80th season of the Polska Hokej Liga, the top level of ice hockey in Poland.

Teams
Ten teams participated in the league: Orlik Opole and Naprzód Janów moved up from the 1. Liga while KTH Krynica did not play in the PHL as they did not obtain a license, which allowed Podhale Nowy Targ to stay in the PHL.

Format
The regular season format was changed from the previous season. After 36 matches, GKS Tychy led the league with 82 points. Then the league has been divided into two groups for the Second Round: Group A, consisting of the top 6 teams competing against each other; and Group B, consisting of the bottom 4 teams competing.

Results
In the stronger group (Group A), JKH GKS Jastrzębie finished in first place at the end of the season, and from the weaker group (Group B), Orlik Opole and Naprzód Janów advanced to the playoff round. GKS Tychy won the playoff championship, the second championship in the club's history. GKS Katowice was relegated to the 1. Liga at the end of the season.

Regular season (first round) 

After 36 matches, the top 6 teams advanced to the stronger group (Group A) to determine standings before playoffs. The bottom 4 teams advanced to the weaker group (Group B) to determine the two teams that would also advance to the playoffs, and the team that would be relegated.

Regular season (second round, Group A) 

The top 6 teams from the First Round were put in this group to determine the standings before the playoffs. Results from the Second Round are added to results from the First Round.

Regular season (Second Reound, Group B) 

The bottom 4 teams from the First Round were put in this group to determine the standings before the playoffs. Results from the Second Round are added to results from the First Round.The top two teams advanced to the playoffs, while the bottom two teams did not. The last place team was relegated.

Playoffs

External links 
 Polish Ice Hockey Federation
 PHL

Polska Hokej Liga seasons
Polska
Polska